Leila Fawaz is a Lebanese historian and academician. She is the founding director of The Fares Center for Eastern Mediterranean Studies from 2001 to 2012. Fawaz was born in Sudan to Greek-Orthodox Lebanese parents and raised in Lebanon. She took two degrees at the American University of Beirut between 1967 and 1968 and studied history at Harvard University between 1972 and 1979.

From 1990 to 1994, Fawaz was the editor-in-chief of The International Journal of Middle East Studies, where she advanced conducting analytical and comparative research, with an international and cross-disciplinary approach. She bemoaned the overspecialization within the field, the neglect of attention to humanities/arts and, uninteresting writing, and linked these problems to Middle East studies as a whole, because researchers were "still a long way from being pathfinders in the world of scholarship generally."

References

20th-century Lebanese historians
Living people
American University of Beirut alumni
Harvard University alumni
Year of birth missing (living people)
Women historians
Tufts University faculty
Academic journal editors
Chevaliers of the Légion d'honneur
21st-century Lebanese historians